Hamidul Haque nswc, psc (born 23 June 1970) is a Major General of Bangladesh Army. He is incumbent Director General of Directorate-General of Forces Intelligence. Prior to join DGFI, he was the General officer commanding of the 17th Infantry Division and Sylhet Area Commander.

Early life 
Haque was born on 23 June 1970 in the village of Palakata in Eidgah Union, Eidgaon Upazila, Cox's Bazar District, East Pakistan, Pakistan. He completed his SSC and HSC from Eidgah Model High School and Chittagong College respectively. He was admitted to Bangladesh Military Academy in 1986 and received his commission on 22 June 1990.

Career 
Haque has commanded the  99 Composite Brigade that is responsible for the security of the Padma Bridge. He has served in the United Nations peacekeeping forces in Sierra Leone and South Sudan.

Haque commanded the 203rd Infantry Brigade of Bangladesh Army in Chittagong Hill Tracts and Commander of the Khagrachari region. He met residents of Khagrachari District and called for them to surrender any illegal weapons on 25 September 2018. He has also served as the College Secretary of the National Defence College and member of the college's governing body. He become Director General of DGFI on October, 2022.

Personal life 
Haque is married to Nusrat Jahan Mukta. Together they have three sons.

References 

Living people
1970 births
People from Cox's Bazar District
Bangladesh Army generals
Bangladeshi generals
Directors General of the Directorate General of Forces Intelligence